Windermere railway station serves Windermere in Cumbria, England. It is just south of the A591, about 25 min walk or a short bus ride from the lake. The station is located behind a branch of the Booths supermarket chain, which occupies the site of the original station building, in front of the Lakeland store. It is the terminus of the former Kendal and Windermere Railway single-track Windermere Branch Line, with a single platform (much longer than the trains usually seen there today) serving one terminal track.

The station is owned by Network Rail and is operated by Northern Trains who provide all passenger train services.

The Terrace, a row of cottages, built for railway executives in 1849, is said to have been designed by the architect Augustus Pugin. One of the fireplaces is a copy of one of his in the Palace of Westminster.

The selection of the town of Birthwaite as the location of the station serving the lake was what led to it taking the name Windermere, even though it is not on the water (nowadays it has essentially grown together with Bowness-on-Windermere, which touches the lake).

Layout

The station was at one time bigger than at present, with four platforms and an overall roof. Three tracks were taken out of use when the branch was reduced to a one-train operated single line in 1973 as an economy measure. The single track was cut back to a new truncated station in 1986 following the demolition of the trainshed and the building of a supermarket, which incorporates the facade and canopy of the original station. The Booths supermarket has also been designed to mimic the appearance of the original trainshed.

Facilities
The station has a staffed ticket office that is open throughout the week (06:00- 20:45 Weekdays and Saturdays, 10:30 to 20:45 Sundays); a self-service ticket machine is also provided for use outside these times and for collecting pre-paid tickets.  A post box, toilets and a waiting room are available, along with cycle hire facilities and a pay phone.  Running information is offered via digital CIS displays and timetable posters.  Level access is available from the ticket office and station entrance to the platform. Responsibility for operating the line passed from First TransPennine Express to Northern in April 2016.

Services

Northern run a mixture of Class 156 and Class 195 diesel multiple units at a frequency of one per hour in each direction along the line, which runs through Staveley, Burneside, and Kendal, and then interchanges with Avanti West Coast and TransPennine Express services at Oxenholme Lake District. A couple of services per day then run to Manchester Airport, while a few continue beyond Oxenholme but only as far as Lancaster or Preston. There is also a service to Blackpool North every weeknight and a daily service from Barrow-in-Furness.

Bus services
The station is also a hub for Stagecoach bus services connecting Windermere with Coniston, Grasmere, Keswick, Kendal and other destinations in Cumbria. Stagecoach also run regular buses through the town to the lake at Bowness-on-Windermere on the 599 route; these buses are open-top double-decker buses and run every 20 minutes in the summer. The 597 minibus service links the station with the housing estates and health centre three mornings a week.

References

 Vaughn, J.A.M (1980), Modern Branch Line Album, Ian Allan Publishing Ltd (Shepperton, Surrey).

External links

Stagecoach Cumbria and North Lancashire
Buses from the station
Buses to the station

Railway stations in Cumbria
DfT Category E stations
Former London and North Western Railway stations
Railway stations in Great Britain opened in 1847
Northern franchise railway stations
Windermere, Cumbria
1847 establishments in England